The Flagellation of Christ, sometimes known as Christ at the Column or the Scourging at the Pillar, is a scene from the Passion of Christ very frequently shown in Christian art, in cycles of the Passion or the larger subject of the Life of Christ.  It is the fourth station of the modern alternate Stations of the Cross, and a Sorrowful Mystery of the Rosary. The column to which Christ is normally tied, and the rope, scourge, whip or birch are elements in the Arma Christi. The Basilica di Santa Prassede in Rome claims to possess the original column.

From the 15th century the subject is also painted in individual works, rather than as one of a series of Passion scenes. The most-discussed single work is the enigmatic treatment on a small panel in Urbino by Piero della Francesca (1455–60), whose precise meaning has eluded generations of art historians.  At the same time Christ at the Column or Christ at the Stake developed as an image of Christ alone tied to a column or stake. This was most popular in Baroque sculpture, and also related to the subject, not found in the canonical Gospels, of Christ in the Dungeon. It is often difficult to distinguish between these two, and between Christ at the Column and a Flagellation.

The Church of the Flagellation, at the supposed site in Jerusalem, was rebuilt in 1839 and again in 1929.

Gospels
Flagellation at the hands of the Romans is mentioned in three of the four canonical Gospels: John 19:1, Mark 15:15, and Matthew 27:26, and was the usual prelude to crucifixion under Roman law.  None of the three accounts is more detailed than John's "Then Pilate took Jesus and had him flogged" (NIV). Luke's comparable account, Luke 22:63-65 is of the High Priest's guards beating and mocking Jesus.  In the Passion of Christ the episode precedes the Mocking of Christ and the Crowning with Thorns, which according to the Gospels happened at the same time or immediately after.  Unlike the flogging, these were not part of the normal Roman judicial process.

In art
It first appears in art in the West in the 9th century. It is almost never found in Byzantine art, and remains very rare in Eastern Orthodox art at any date. Initially found in illuminated manuscripts and small ivories, there are surviving monumental wall-paintings from around 1000 in Italy. From the start there are most often three figures, Christ and two servants of Pontius Pilate who whip him. In early depictions Christ may be naked, or wearing a long robe, facing out or seen from behind; from the 12th century it is standard that Christ wears a loincloth (perizoma) and faces out towards the viewer.  Christ's face is normally visible, giving artists the "technical problem of showing him receiving the strokes on his back - the usual place - while at the same time leaving his face visible. Often he appears to be receiving the strokes on the front of his body.

Pontius Pilate is sometimes shown watching the scene, and his wife's servant may approach him with her message, and in the later Middle Ages, probably under the influence of Passion plays, the number of men beating Christ may be three or four, increasingly caricatured in the North as grotesque figures in the dress of contemporary mercenaries.  Sometimes another figure, who may be Herod, is present. The Flagellation was at the hands of those working for Pontius Pilate, but the floggers may sometimes wear Jewish hats.  Following the Maestà of Duccio, the scene may take place in public, before an audience of the Jewish people.

The Franciscans, who promoted self-flagellation as a means of identification with the suffering of Christ, were probably responsible for a number of large Italian processional crosses in which the Flagellation occupies the back of the cross, with a Crucifixion on the front. These were presumably sometimes followed in processions by flagellants, who could see Christ suffering in front of them.

In film
In modern times, filmmakers have depicted Christ being flogged. It is a significant scene in Mel Gibson's 2004 The Passion of the Christ. In Kubrick's A Clockwork Orange, Alex imagines himself as a Roman soldier flogging Jesus.

Notable examples
Single works:
Flagellation of Christ (Piero della Francesca) 1455–60
Christ at the Column (Antonello da Messina) ca. 1475
The Flagellation of Christ (Caravaggio) 1607
Christ at the Column (Caravaggio)  1607
In cycles:
Maestà (Duccio)
Scrovegni Chapel by Giotto

Gallery of art

See also
 Life of Jesus in the New Testament

References

 English translation from German

Crucifixion of Jesus
Iconography of Jesus
Sorrowful Mysteries
Passion of Jesus in art by theme
 

es:Cristo en la columna